This is a list of bands that are considered part of the second wave of punk rock, beginning in the mid- to late-1980s.

A
A.F.
AFI
Agent Orange
Alkaline Trio
All
Amebix 
Anti System
Antidote
Antisect
Anti-Flag
Anti-Establishment
Anti-Nowhere League
Anti-Scrunti Faction
The Apostles
Attila the Stockbroker

B
Bad Brains
Bad Religion
Bickley
Big Black
Big Boys
Big Drill Car
Bikini Kill
Blaggers I.T.A.
Blatz
Boikot
Bored Suburban Youth
Born Against
Bouncing Souls
Broken Bones

C
The Casualties
Chaotic Dischord
Charged GBH
Chemical People
Chumbawamba
Chaos UK
Circle Jerks
Citizen Fish
Coca Carola
Cockney Rejects
Conflict
Cows
Crimpshrine
Cringer
Cro-Mags
Crucifucks
Corrosion of Conformity

D
D.O.A.
Daisy Chainsaw
Dayglo Abortions
Dead Kennedys
De Heideroosjes
Dead Milkmen
Descendents
Die Ärzte
Die Kassierer
Dicks
Discharge
Down By Law
Drei Flaschen
Dritte Wahl

E
Electric Frankenstein
Eskorbuto
Excuse 17
The Exploited

F
Face to Face
The Faction
The Faith
Fifteen
Firehose
Flatcat
The Flatliners
The Flesh Eaters
Fleshies
Flipper
Flux of Pink Indians
Frenzal Rhomb
Frightwig
Fugazi

G
Good Riddance
Government Issue
Guttermouth
Green Day

H
Hammerhead
Hi-Standard
Hogan's Heroes
The Honor System
The Hope Bombs
Horrorpops
Hot Snakes
Hot Water Music

J
Janez Detd.
The Julie Ruin
Justin Scarred

K
Killdozer
Klamydia
Kronstadt Uprising

L
Lagwagon
The Lawrence Arms
Leningrad
The Living End
Longstocking
The Loved Ones
Lower Class Brats

M
Magnapop
The Marked Men
Mary Ellis
The Matches
Meat Puppets
The Menzingers
Minor Threat
Minutemen
The Murder City Devils
MDC
Melvins
Mob 47
Murphy's Law
Mustard Plug
Misfits
Mission of Burma

N
Nailpin
Neck
The Need
Negative Approach
New Bomb Turks
Nomeansno
No Use for a Name
NOFX

O
The Offspring
One Man Army
Operation Ivy
Organ Thieves
One Way System

P
Pansy Division
Pegboy
Pennywise
Peter and the Test Tube Babies
The Phantom Limbs
Phinius Gage
Picture Frame Seduction
Pinhead Gunpowder
Pistol Grip
Protein
Pulley
Punchline
The Punkles
PUP

Q
The Queers

R
Rancid
Reagan Youth
The Real McKenzies
Redd Kross
Reel Big Fish
The Riffs
Rich Kids on LSD
Rise Against
RIOT 111
Rites of Spring
Rollins Band
Rudimentary Peni
Rx Bandits

S
Samhain
Samiam
The Scarred
Scaterd Few
Scratch Acid
Screeching Weasel
Seaweed
Sham 69
She Devils
Sheer Terror
Sick of it All
Sister George
Slick Shoes
Sloppy Seconds
SNFU
Social Distortion
Soulside
The Spermbirds
Steve Bjorklund
The Stitches
Street Dogs
Streetlight Manifesto
Strung Out
Subhumans (UK band)
Suicidal Tendencies
The Suicide Machines
Sum 41
Swingin' Utters

T
Tales of Terror
Teen Idles
Terrorgruppe
The Scarred
Three Dollar Bill
Toxic Waste
T.S.O.L.
Two Man Advantage
The Templars
The Transplants
Total Chaos
Toy Dolls

V
The Vandals
The Varukers

W
Wizo
Wrangler Brutes

Y
The Young Werewolves

Z
Zebrahead

Lists of punk bands